The WSF World Team Squash Championships are an international squash competition organised by the World Squash Federation (WSF) and played between teams representing different nations. Countries enter teams of three or four players to represent them in the championships. In each round of the competition, teams face each other in a best-of-three singles matches contest. The competition is held once every two years, with the venue changing each time. Normally the men's and women's events are held in different years in two locations.

Men's

Past winners

Summary of finalists
Source:

Women's

Past winners

Summary of finalists
Source:

See also 
 European Squash Team Championships
 Asian Squash Team Championships

References 

Squash tournaments
Squash records and statistics

de:Squashweltmeisterschaft